Black Ocean is the second studio album by metalcore band Century, the first since the band signed with Prosthetic Records. The album was produced, recorded and mixed by frontman Carson Slovak at his own studio and mastered by Kim Rosen of West Westside Studios. Black Ocean features a cipher code within its artwork to unlock hidden content on the interactive album website blackoceanalbum.com. A video for the track "Black Ocean" was made and debuted on Headbangers Ball in April 2008. Revolver Magazine selected Black Ocean as its #18 album in its Top 20 Albums for 2008 in the February 2009 issue.

Track listing
All songs were written by Century, except where noted.

"Pantheon" – 3:06
"Black Ocean" – 3:37
"Erasure" – 3:57
"Drug Mule" – 3:15
"Equus" – 3:42
"Rising Sun" – 3:17
"Monolith" (Century, Mike Guilliano) – 4:00
"Daylight Algorithm" – 4:51
"Dysgenics" – 0:43
"Terror Starts at Home" – 2:44

Personnel
Carson Slovak – guitar, vocals
Mike Giuliano – guitar
Joshua Groah – bass
Matthew Smith – drums
Jason Baker – backing vocals
Ricky Armellino – backing vocals

References

External links
http://www.blackoceanalbum.com/
The Metal Minute: CD Review: Century - Black Ocean
Century - Black Ocean  at Billboard.com

2008 albums
Century (American band) albums